German submarine U-1169 was a Type VIIC/41 U-boat of Nazi Germany's Kriegsmarine during World War II.

She was ordered on 2 April 1942, and was laid down on 9 April 1943, at Danziger Werft AG, Danzig, as yard number 141. She was launched on 2 October 1943, and commissioned under the command of Oberleutnant zur See Heinz Goldbeck on 9 February 1944.

Design
German Type VIIC/41 submarines were preceded by the heavier Type VIIC submarines. U-1169 had a displacement of  when at the surface and  while submerged. She had two shafts and two  propellers.

U-1169 was fitted with five  torpedo tubes (four fitted at the bow and one at the stern), fourteen torpedoes or 26 TMA or TMB Naval mines, one  SK C/35 naval gun, (220 rounds), one  Flak M42 and two  C/30 anti-aircraft guns. The boat had a complement of between forty-four and fifty-two.

Service history
On 29 March 1945, 38 days out of Kristiansand, on her first, and only, war patrol, she was located by the British frigate . U-1169 was sunk by depth charges in the English Channel south of Lizard Point, killing all 49 of her crew.

See also
 Battle of the Atlantic

References

Bibliography

German Type VIIC/41 submarines
U-boats commissioned in 1944
World War II submarines of Germany
1943 ships
Ships built in Danzig
Maritime incidents in March 1945
World War II shipwrecks in the English Channel
U-boats sunk by British warships
U-boats sunk by depth charges